Gilmore House may refer to:

in the United States (by state then city)
Gilmore House (Calais, Maine), listed on the National Register of Historic Places (NRHP) in Washington County
Onslow Gilmore House, Stoneham, Massachusetts, listed on the NRHP in Middlesex County
Gilmore-Patterson Farm, St. Paul's, North Carolina, listed on the NRHP in Bladen County
Gilmore House (Holly Hill, South Carolina), formerly listed on the National Register of Historic Places in Orangeburg County, South Carolina
Elizabeth Harden Gilmore House, Charleston, West Virginia, listed on the NRHP in Kanawha County
Eugene A. Gilmore House, Madison, Wisconsin, a Frank Lloyd Wright-designed house, NRHP-listed in Dane County

See also
Walker Gilmore site, listed on the NRHP in Nebraska